The 2020 ITTF Finals, also referred to as the Bank of Communications 2020 ITTF Finals for sponsorship reasons, was a table tennis tournament that took place from 19 to 22 November 2020 in Zhengzhou, China. The tournament was organised by the International Table Tennis Federation as a one-off replacement for the ITTF World Tour Grand Finals, which was cancelled in 2020 due to the impact of the COVID-19 pandemic on sports. 

After series of cancellation of tournaments this year, the 2020 ITTF Finals is one of the three year-end tournaments that conclude the table tennis calendar in 2020. The other two, the 2020 ITTF World Cup and the inaugural World Table Tennis Macao, were also held in November in China.

Events

Qualification

The top 16 players in the April 2020 ITTF World Ranking were invited to compete in men's and women's singles events, subject to a maximum of four players from each national association. Players were seeded according to their November 2020 World Ranking.

Men's singles

Players

Draw

Women's singles

Players

Draw

See also

2020 World Team Table Tennis Championships
2020 ITTF Men's World Cup
2020 ITTF Women's World Cup
2020 ITTF World Tour

References

External links

International Table Tennis Federation

2020
Finals
ITTF Finals
Table tennis competitions in China
International sports competitions hosted by China
ITTF Finals
ITTF Finals